Paraul (Pari-avul) is a rural locality (a selo) in Karabudakhkentsky District, Republic of Dagestan, Russia. The population was 4,949 as of 2010. There are 66 streets.

Geography 
Paraul is located 90 km northwest of Novokayakent (the district's administrative centre) by road. Karabudakhkent and Buynaksk are the nearest rural localities.

References 

Rural localities in Karabudakhkentsky District